Tobias Blum (born 16 January 1995) is a German long-distance runner. In 2020, he competed in the men's race at the 2020 World Athletics Half Marathon Championships held in Gdynia, Poland.

References

External links 
 

Living people
1995 births
Place of birth missing (living people)
German male long-distance runners
German male marathon runners
21st-century German people